Port Royal is an abandoned settlement in Newfoundland and Labrador.
Located on Long Island Placentia Bay.

See also 
 List of ghost towns in Newfoundland and Labrador

Ghost towns in Newfoundland and Labrador